INVAP S.E. is an Argentine company that provides design, integration, construction and delivery of equipment, plants and devices. The company operates in North America, Europe, Asia Pacific, Latin America, the Middle East and Africa, and delivers projects for nuclear, aerospace, chemical, medical, petroleum and governmental sectors.

The company is an unlisted private company, the sole owner being the Province of Río Negro. Its headquarters is in San Carlos de Bariloche. As of 2015, the company directly employs 1330 people, from which 59% are highly qualified professionals. 

In 2018 the company was avowed as the most important business from Argentina, winning the Diamond Konex Award.

Background
INVAP was created on September 1, 1976, as a spin-off of the Argentine Atomic Energy Commission, research laboratories division. The name INVAP is a portmanteau of the words investigación aplicada ("applied research" in Spanish).

Satellites

INVAP was the first company in Latin America certified by NASA (the US (National) Aeronautics and Space Administration) to supply space technologies.   It constructs satellites, payloads, and ground stations, including the SAC ("Satelites de Aplicación Científica") satellite family, developed for the Argentine space agency CONAE. INVAP was the first company in Latin America to provide design, development, mission control and operational support.

The SAC-D was put into orbit on June 9, 2011, carrying several scientific payloads, including NASA's $100 million Aquarius project, which will measure the oceans' salinity. ARSAT-1 - the first communications satellite entirely built in Argentina - was launched in 2014, while a second satellite in the series, ARSAT-2 was launched in September 2015.

Nuclear projects
In the field of nuclear projects, the company specializes in the design and construction of nuclear research reactors, radioisotope production plants, nuclear fuel manufacturing plants, uranium enrichment facilities, neutron beam transport systems, radiation protection instrumentation, reactor protection systems, and modernization and refurbishment of research reactors. INVAP also conducts consultancy and research activities for nuclear power plant suppliers in areas such as nuclear reactor fuels, isotope separation by lasers and reactor core reshuffling studies for nuclear power plants.

INVAP has constructed and installed the following nuclear reactors:

In 2009, INVAP and the Spanish group Isolux were pre-selected in an international tender, known as the PALLAS project. This entailed the procurement of an 80 MW nuclear reactor for the Dutch city of Petten (see Petten nuclear reactor), but in February 2010, the Dutch radiopharmaceutical producer Nuclear Research and Consultancy Group (NRG) extended the preparatory phase up to end of the year for financing.

In 2010, INVAP and CITEDEF completed the development and readied for testing a method that used a laser to remove the radioactive components from heavy water which is used to cool nuclear reactors.

On the 24th of January, 2018, INVAP won the international tender for a nuclear research reactor and radioisotope production facility for medical uses in The Netherlands.

Other projects 
Civilian

TDA - Design and implementation of the public terrestrial Argentine digital TV project
 Satellites and space research payload for CONAE
 Systems for early detection of forest fires
 Eleven (plus 11 more in order) 2D radars INKAN for the Administración Nacional de Aviación Civil (ANAC) the Argentine Civilian Agency in charge of air traffic control 
 Wind power
 Dry-freeze plants, for preservation of fruits and vegetables.
 Storage solutions for irradiated nuclear fuel from NPP and Research Reactors.
 Radioisotope processing plants 
 Petrochemical plants.
 CAREM nuclear reactors for nuclear power generating and to propel future Argentine Nuclear Powered Submarine (SNA).
Military
 Hangar doors for the Argentine Navy destroyer 
 FLIR system for Argentine Navy P-3 Orion aircraft 
 Sonar systems for Argentine Navy destroyers, frigates and future Nuclear Powered submarine.
 3D radar prototype  plus 6 in order  for the Argentine Air Force
 Maritime patrol simulators
 Naval electronics and battle management systems for Argentine Navy Meko 360 type destroyers, MEKO 140 type frigates, and TR-1700 submarines.
 A synthetic aperture radar to replace the Bendix RDR-1500B on the maritime patrol aircraft Beechcraft Super King Air of the Argentine Naval Aviation

Gallery

See also
CONAE - National space agency
ARSAT - Government owned communication company
CEATSA - Environmental testing company owned in association with ARSAT.

References

External links
 Official website Spanish - English
 La enciclopedia de ciencias y tecnologías en Argentina (Spanish) INVAP - ECyT-ar Retrieved March 11, 2017

Nuclear technology companies of Argentina
Defense companies of Argentina
Technology companies established in 1976
Argentine brands
Bariloche
1976 establishments in Argentina